Valentin Vacherot (born 16 November 1998) is a French-Monegasque tennis player.

Vacherot has a career high ATP singles ranking of 271 achieved on 29 August 2022. He also has a career high ATP doubles ranking of 1076 achieved on 29 August 2022.

Vacherot represents Monaco at the Davis Cup, where he has a win–loss record of 4–0.

College career
Vacherot played college tennis at Texas A&M University.

Challenger and Futures/World Tennis Tour Finals

Singles: 9 (5-4)

References

External links
 
 
 
 Valentin Vacherot at Texas A&M University

1998 births
Living people
French male tennis players
Monegasque male tennis players
Texas A&M Aggies men's tennis players